Averești may refer to several villages in Romania:

 Averești, a village in Ion Creangă Commune, Neamț County
 Averești, a village in Bunești-Averești Commune, Vaslui County